Utah State Route 6 may refer to:

 U.S. Route 6 in Utah, the state designation (legislative overlay) for the majority of U.S. Route 6 (except its concurrencies with Interstate 15 and Interstate 70) within Utah, United States, that runs from Nevada to Colorado (through Millard, Juab, Utah, Wasatch, Carbon, and Emery counties)
 By Utah State law, U.S. Route 6 within the state (except its concurrencies with Interstate 15 and Interstate 70) has been defined as "State Route 6" since 1977
 Utah State Route 6 (1920s-1977), the state designation (legislative overlay) for the section of U.S. Route 40 (that is now the entire current routing of U.S. Route 40) in Utah, United States, that ran through Summit, Wasatch, Duchesne, and Uintah counties

See also

 List of state highways in Utah
 List of U.S. Highways in Utah
 List of named highway junctions in Utah
 List of highways numbered 6

External links

 Utah Department of Transportation Highway Resolutions: Route 6 (PDF)